There are more than 700 species of mammals in Brazil, and according to the Chico Mendes Institute for Biodiversity Conservation and Brazil's Ministry of the Environment, about 110 species and subspecies are threatened and one is extinct. The Brazilian definition of "threatened species" uses the same criteria and categories established by IUCN. Among the 12 mammal orders which occur in Brazil, eleven have threatened species, except Lagomorpha (which has only one species in Brazil, the Brazilian cottontail). Although the rodents have been the most diverse order of mammals, the order with most species on this list is the Primates (34 species).

This list of threatened species was published in Diário Oficial da União, on December 17, 2014. Even though some species have been removed from the list, (for instance, the humpback whale), the number of threatened species has increased in comparison with the former list (which had had 69 species). The Brazilian tapir, the white-lipped peccary, the short-eared dog and many rodents have been included in the list. Many of them are just regionally threatened. In spite of using the same criteria, ICMBio list often shows a different conservation status than IUCN. That is because the assessments were done at different times by different researchers.

Most Brazilian mammals are considered to be vulnerable. In contrast with the former list, one species is considered extinct (Vespucci's rodent) and two might be extinct in Brazil (black-shouldered opossum and candango mouse; "probably extinct" - PEx).

Threatened mammals of Brazil - ICMBio (2014)

Order Didelphimorphia (opossums)

Family Didelphidae
 Caluromysiops irrupta (black-shouldered opossum)  - ICMBio status PEx
 Marmosops paulensis (Brazilian slender opossum)  - ICMBio status 
 Thylamys macrurus (Paraguayan fat-tailed mouse opossum)  - ICMBio status 
 Thylamys velutinus (dwarf fat-tailed mouse opossum)  - ICMBio status

Order Pilosa (anteaters and sloths)

Family Bradypodidae (three-toed sloths)
 Bradypus torquatus (maned sloth)  - ICMBio status 

Family Myrmecophagidae (anteaters)
 Myrmecophaga tridactyla (giant anteater)  - ICMBio status

Order Cingulata (armadillos)

Family Dasypodidae
 Priodontes maximus (giant armadillo)  - ICMBio status 
 Tolypeutes tricinctus (Brazilian three-banded armadillo)  - ICMBio status

Order Chiroptera (bats)

Family Furipteridae (smoky bats)
 Furipterus horrens (thumbless bat)  - ICMBio status 

Family Natalidae (funnel-eared bats)
 Natalus macrourus (Brazilian funnel-eared bat)  - ICMBio status 

Family Phyllostomidae (New World leaf-nosed bats)
 Glyphonycteris behnii (Behn's bat)  - ICMBio status 
 Lonchophylla aurita  - ICMBio status 
 Lonchophylla dekeyseri (Dekeyser's nectar bat)  - ICMBio status 
 Xeronycteris vieirai (Vieira's long-tongued bat)  - ICMBio status 

Family Vespertilionidae (vesper bats)
 Eptesicus taddeii  - ICMBio status

Order Primates (monkeys, marmosets, tamarins)

Family Atelidae (howlers, spider and woolly monkeys, muriquis)
 Alouatta belzebul (red-handed howler)  - ICMBio status 
 Alouatta discolor (Spix's red-handed howler)  - ICMBio status 
 Alouatta guariba clamitans (southern brown howler)  - ICMBio status 
 Alouatta guariba guariba (northern brown howler)  - ICMBio status 
 Alouatta ululata (Maranhão red-handed howler)  - ICMBio status 
 Ateles belzebuth (white-bellied spider monkey)  - ICMBio status 
 Ateles chamek (Peruvian spider monkey)  - ICMBio status 
 Ateles marginatus (white-cheeked spider monkey)  - ICMBio status 
 Brachyteles arachnoides (southern muriqui)  - ICMBio status 
 Brachyteles hypoxanthus (northern muriqui)  - ICMBio status 
 Lagothrix cana cana (gray woolly monkey)  - ICMBio status 
 Lagothrix lagothricha (brown woolly monkey)  - ICMBio status 
 Lagothrix poeppigii (silvery woolly monkey)  - ICMBio status 

Famlily Callitrichidae (tamarins and marmosets)

 Callithrix aurita (buffy-tufted marmoset)  - ICMBio status 
 Callithrix flaviceps (buffy-headed marmoset)  - ICMBio status 
 Leontopithecus caissara (Superagui lion tamarin)  - ICMBio status 
 Leontopithecus chrysomelas (golden-headed lion tamarin)  - ICMBio status 
 Leontopithecus chrysopygus (black lion tamarin)  - ICMBio status 
 Leontopithecus rosalia (golden lion tamarin)  - ICMBio status 
 Mico rondoni (Rondon's marmoset)  - ICMBio status 
 Saguinus bicolor (pied tamarin)  - ICMBio status 
 Saguinus niger (black tamarin)  - ICMBio status 

Family Cebidae (capuchins and squirrel monkeys)
 Cebus kaapori (Kaapori capuchin)  - ICMBio status 
 Saimiri vanzolinii (black squirrel monkey)  - ICMBio status 
 Sapajus cay (Azaras's capuchin)  - ICMBio status 
 Sapajus flavius (blond capuchin)  - ICMBio status 
 Sapajus robustus (crested capuchin)  - ICMBio status 
 Sapajus xanthosternos (golden-bellied capuchin)  - ICMBio status 

Family Pitheciidae (titis, saki monkeys and uakaris)
 Cacajao hosomi (Neblina uakari)  - ICMBio status 
 Callicebus barbarabrownae (Barbara Brown's titi)  - ICMBio status 
 Callicebus coimbrai (Coimbra Filho's titi)  - ICMBio status 
 Callicebus melanochir (coastal black-handed titi)  - ICMBio status 
 Callicebus personatus (Atlantic titi)  - ICMBio status 
 Chiropotes satanas (black bearded saki)  - ICMBio status 
 Chiropotes utahicki (Uta Hick's bearded saki)  - ICMBio status

Order Carnivora (cats, dogs and relatives)

Family Canidae (dogs)
 Atelocynus microtis (short-eared dog)  - ICMBio status 
 Chrysocyon brachyurus (maned wolf)  - ICMBio status 
 Lycalopex vetulus (hoary fox)  - ICMBio status 
 Speothos venaticus (bush dog)  - ICMBio status 

Family Mustelidae (otters)
 Pteronura brasiliensis (giant otter)  - ICMBio status 

Family Felidae (cats)
 Leopardus colocolo (colocolo)  - ICMBio status 
 Leopardus geoffroyi (Geoffroy's cat)  - ICMBio status 
 Leopardus guttulus (southern tigrina)  - ICMBio status 
 Leopardus tigrinus (oncilla)  - ICMBio status 
 Leopardus wiedii (margay)  - ICMBio status 
 Puma concolor (cougar)  - ICMBio status 
 Puma yagouaroundi (jaguarundi)  - ICMBio status 
 Panthera onca (jaguar)  - ICMBio status

Order Cetacea (whales and dolphins)

Family Balaenidae (whales)
 Eubalaena australis (southern right whale)  - ICMBio status 

Family Balaenopteridae (rorquals)
 Balaenoptera musculus (blue whale)  - ICMBio status 
 Balaenoptera physalus (fin whale)  - ICMBio status 
 Balaenoptera borealis (sei whale)  - ICMBio status 

Family Delphinidae (dolphins)
 Sotalia guianensis (Guiana dolphin)  - ICMBio status 

Family Iniidae (river dolphins)
 Inia geoffrensis (Amazon river dolphin)  - ICMBio status 

Family Physeteridae (sperm whales)
 Physeter macrocephalus (sperm whale)  - ICMBio status 

Family Pontoporiidae (river dolphins)
 Pontoporia blainvillei (La Plata dolphin)  - ICMBio status

Order Sirenia (manatees)

Family Trichechidae
 Trichechus inunguis (Amazonian manatee)  - ICMBio status 
 Trichechus manatus (West Indian manatee)  - ICMBio status

Order Perissodactyla (odd-toed ungulates)

Family Tapiridae (tapirs)
 Tapirus terrestris (Brazilian tapir)  - ICMBio status

Order Artiodactyla (even-toed ungulates)

Family Cervidae (deers)
 Blastocerus dichotomus (marsh deer)  - ICMBio status 
 Mazama bororo (small red brocket)  - ICMBio status 
 Mazama nana (pygmy brocket)  - ICMBio status 
 Ozotoceros bezoarticus bezoarticus (Pampas deer)  - ICMBio status 
 Ozotoceros bezoarticus leucogaster (Pampas deer)  - ICMBio status 

Family Tayassuidae (peccaries)
 Tayassu pecari (white-lipped peccary)  - ICMBio status

Order Rodentia (rodents)

Family Caviidae (cavies)
 Cavia intermedia (Santa Catarina's guinea pig)  - ICMBio status 
 Kerodon acrobata (acrobatic cavy)  - ICMBio status 
 Kerodon rupestris (rock cavy)  - ICMBio status 

Family Cricetidae (New World rats and mice)
 Akodon mystax (Caparaó grass mouse)  - ICMBio status 
 Cerradomys goytaca  - ICMBio status 
 Euryoryzomys lamia (buffy-sided oryzomys)  - ICMBio status 
 Gyldenstolpia planaltensis  - ICMBio status 
 Juscelinomys candango (candango mouse)  - ICMBio status PEx
 Microakodontomys transitorius (transitional colilargo)  - ICMBio status 
 Noronhomys vespuccii (Vespucci's rodent)  - ICMBio status 
 Oligoryzomys rupestris  - ICMBio status 
 Rhipidomys cariri (Cariri climbing mouse)  - ICMBio status 
 Rhipidomys tribei (yellow-bellied climbing mouse)  - ICMBio status 
 Thalpomys cerradensis (Cerrado mouse)  - ICMBio status 
 Thalpomys lasiotis (hairy-eared Cerrado mouse)  - ICMBio status 
 Wilfredomys oenax (greater Wilfred's mouse)  - ICMBio status 

Family Ctenomyidae (tuco-tucos)
 Ctenomys bicolor - ICMBio status 
 Ctenomys flamarioni (Flamarion's tuco-tuco)  - ICMBio status 
 Ctenomys lami (Lami tuco-tuco)  - ICMBio status 
 Ctenomys minutus (tiny tuco-tuco)  - ICMBio status 

Family Echimyidae
 Callistomys pictus (painted tree-rat)  - ICMBio status 
 Phyllomys lundi (Lund's Atlantic tree-rat)  - ICMBio status 
 Phyllomys unicolor (short-furred Atlantic tree-rat)  - ICMBio status 
 Phyllomys brasiliensis (orange-brown Atlantic tree-rat)  - ICMBio status 
 Phyllomys thomasi (giant Atlantic tree-rat)  - ICMBio status 
 Trinomys eliasi (Elias' Atlantic spiny rat)  - ICMBio status 
 Trinomys moojeni (Moojen's Atlantic spiny rat)  - ICMBio status 
 Trinomys mirapitanga (dark-caped Atlantic spiny rat)  - ICMBio status 
 Trinomys yonenagae (Yonenaga's Atlantic spiny rat)  - ICMBio status 

Family Erethizontidae (New World porcupine)
 Chaetomys subspinosus (bristle-spined rat)  - ICMBio status 
 Coendou speratus  - ICMBio status

See also
List of mammals of Brazil

References

Brazil
.
Nature conservation in Brazil
Mammals,Brazil